Keep Coming Back is the fourth studio album by Marc Broussard. It is a collection of all-new material and was preceded by two iTunes exclusive EP releases ("Hard Knocks" and "When It's Good"). It debuted on the Billboard Top 200 albums chart at #136, with 4,400+ copies sold.

Track listing
"Keep Coming Back"
"Hard Knocks"
"Real Good Thing"
"Why Should She Wait" (featuring Sara Bareilles)
"Power's in the People"
"Evil Things"
"When It's Good"  (featuring LeAnn Rimes)
"Man for Life"
"Another Night Alone"
"Saying I Love You"
"Going Home"
"Evangeline Rose" (Untitled Bonus Track)

Personnel
 Roy Agee - trombone
 Tim Akers - Fender Rhodes, moog bass, organ, piano, Wurlitzer
 Sara Bareilles - duet vocals on "Why Should She Wait"
 Marc Broussard - choir, lead vocals, background vocals
 Gary Burnette - acoustic guitar
 Court Clement - electric guitar
 Jeff Coffin - saxophone
 Nickie Conley - background vocals
 David Davidson - concert master, string contractor
 Mark Douthit - saxophone
 Dan Dugmore - dobro, pedal steel guitar
 Jason Eskridge - background vocals
 Chad Gilmore - drums, percussion
 Reggie Gisham - trumpet
 Barry Green - trombone
 Mike Haynes - trumpet
 DeMarco Johnson - clavinet, Fender Rhodes, piano, synthesizer bass, Wurlitzer
 Jennifer Kummer - french horn
 Ken Lewis - percussion
 Steve Patrick - trumpet
 Andrew Ramsey - background vocals
 LeAnn Rimes - duet vocals on "When It's Good"
 Shannon Sanders - background vocals
 Adam Shoenfeld - electric guitar
 Calvin Turner - bass guitar, bells, horn arrangements, horn conductor, mellotron, percussion, string arrangements, string conductor, background vocals

Singles
'Hard Knocks' is the first single. It was released to iTunes as a digital single, and has since charted at #11 on Billboard's "Hot Singles Sales" chart.

'Keep Coming Back', the album's title track, was a promotional single, which Marc performed on several late night and morning talk shows.

'When It's Good' (featuring LeAnn Rimes) was sent to Country radio stations in January 2009.

References

2008 albums
Marc Broussard albums
Atlantic Records albums